Osama Galal Hamed Toeima  (born 17 September 1997) is an Egyptian professional footballer player who plays as a centre-back for Pyramids FC.

He represented Egypt at the 2020 Summer Olympics.

References

External links
 
 
 

Living people
1997 births
Egyptian footballers
Footballers at the 2020 Summer Olympics
Association football defenders
Misr Lel Makkasa SC players
ENPPI SC players
Pyramids FC players
Egyptian Premier League players
People from Tanta
Olympic footballers of Egypt